Nabha State, with its capital at Nabha, was one of the Phulkian princely states of Punjab during the British Raj in India. Nabha was ruled by Jatt Sikhs of the Sidhu clan.

History

Origin 
The ruling house of Nabha belonged to the Phulkian dynasty, sharing a common ancestor named Tiloka with the Jind rulers. Tiloka was the eldest son of Phul Sidhu of the Phulkian Misl. The Nabha rulers descend from Gurditta (Gurdit Singh), the elder son of Tiloka. Gurditta was the founder of the localities of Dhanaula and Sangrur. Sangrur was the headquarters of the state till it was captured by Jind State. Gurditta died in 1754, his only son Surat (or Suratya) Singh had died two years earlier in 1752, leaving his grandson, Hamir Singh, as the next in line. Hamir Singh was the founder of the locality of Nabha and the first ruler of Nabha State.

List of rulers

Demographics

Religion

See also

Patiala and East Punjab States Union
Political integration of India
 Phulkian sardars
 Phulkian Misl
 Patiala State
 Jind State
 Faridkot State
 Malaudh
 Bhadaur
 Kaithal
 Cis-Sutlej states

Notes

References

External links

History of Punjab, India
1763 establishments in India
1947 disestablishments in India
Patiala district
Princely states of Punjab